The Women's 50 metre rifle prone event at the 2013 Southeast Asian Games took place on 12 December 2013 at the North Dagon Shooting Range in Yangon, Myanmar.

Each shooter fired 60 shots with a .22 Long Rifle at 50 metres distance from the prone position. Scores for each shot were in increments of 1, with a maximum score of 10.

Schedule
All times are Myanmar Standard Time (UTC+06:30)

The schedule is given by:

Results

References

Shooting at the 2013 Southeast Asian Games
South